Godspeed, a statement wishing someone a prosperous journey or success, may refer to:

Literature
 Godspeed (Sheffield novel), a 1993 science fiction novel by Charles Sheffield
 Godspeed, an unpublished novel by Will Christopher Baer
 Godspeed, a 2002 novel and 2007 short film by Lynn Breedlove

Music

Bands
 Godspeed (band), an American heavy metal band
 Godspeed, a 1999 band featuring Leif Garrett

Albums
 Godspeed (Glasvegas album) or the title song, 2021
 Godspeed (Symphorce album), 2005
 Godspeed (Vincent album), 2011
 God Speed (album), by Masami Okui, or the title song, 2006
 Godspeed (EP), by Anberlin, or the title song, 2006
 Godspeed, by Don Trip, 2015
 Godspeed, by Mortal, 1998
 Godspeed, by Morten Schantz, 2017

Songs
 "Godspeed", by Alter Bridge from Walk the Sky, 2019
 "Godspeed", by BT from Movement in Still Life, 1999
 "Godspeed", by Frank Ocean from Blonde, 2016
 "Godspeed", by Jenny Lewis from Acid Tongue, 2008
 "Godspeed", by Patti Smith from Easter, 1996 reissue
 "Godspeed", by The Contortionist from Clairvoyant, 2017
 "Godspeed", by The Red Jumpsuit Apparatus from Lonely Road, 2009
 "Godspeed", by The Reklaws from Sophomore Slump, 2020
 "Godspeed", by Wage War from Manic, 2021
 "Godspeed (Sweet Dreams)", by Radney Foster from See What You Want to See, 1999
 "Perfect Circle / God Speed", by Mac Miller from GO:OD AM, 2015

Other uses 
 Godspeed (character), a character featured in DC Comics
 Godspeed (film), a 2016 Taiwanese black comedy road caper film
 "Godspeed" (The Flash episode), an episode of The Flash
 God Speed (painting), a 1900 painting by Edmund Blair Leighton
 Godspeed (ship), a ship on the 1606–1607 voyage that resulted in the founding of Jamestown, Virginia

See also
 
 "God Spede the Plough", an early sixteenth-century manuscript poem
 Goodspeed (surname), as an alternative or older version of the surname